The Nevada Legislature is a bicameral body, consisting of the lower house, the Assembly, with 42 members, and the upper house, the Senate, with 21. With a total of 63 seats, the Legislature is the third-smallest bicameral state legislature in the United States, after Alaska's (60 members) and Delaware's (62). The Nevada State Legislature  is the first majority female State Legislature in the history of the United States. As of 2022, the Democratic Party controls both houses of the Nevada State Legislature. In the 2022 Nevada elections, which were a part of the midterm elections for that year, the Democratic Party obtained a supermajority in the lower house of the state legislature. As for the upper house of the state legislature, the elections provided the Democratic Party with thirteen of the twenty-one seats—amounting to a partisan composition of 61.9 percent.

Establishment
The Nevada Territorial Legislature was established upon creation of the Nevada Territory in 1861. It created the nine original counties during its first session outside Carson City.

Nevada became a state under the Nevada Constitution of 1864, vests the legislative authority of the state in a Senate and Assembly, which are designated "The Legislature of the State of Nevada". The legislature has the duty to establish the number of Senators and Assembly members and the legislative districts to which they are apportioned after each decennial census, though the total number of legislators may not exceed 75. The size of the Senate is tied to the size of the Assembly; the state constitution limits the Senate to no less than one-third and no greater than one-half of the size of the Assembly.

Redistricting bills passed by the legislature after the 2010 US Census were vetoed by the governor, and the legislature was unable to override those vetoes. Ultimately, Nevada's legislative districts as of 2011 were established by order of a state district court. Since that time, Senate districts have been formed by combining two neighboring Assembly districts.

Terms of members
Members of the Assembly are elected to a two-year term with term limits of six terms (12 years). Members of the Senate are elected to a four-year term and similarly face term limits of three terms (12 years). Term limits were amended to the Nevada Constitution following a voter referendum in 1996 as reflected in Nevada Constitution, Art. 4, Sec 4.

Sessions and qualifications
Legislative sessions commence on the first Monday of February following the election of members of the Assembly. The Legislature must adjourn sine die each regular session not later than midnight Pacific Daylight Time (PDT) 120 calendar days following its commencement. Any legislative action taken after midnight PDT on the 120th calendar day is void unless it occurs during a special session convened by the Governor of Nevada. The governor is obligated to submit the proposed executive budget to the Legislature not later than 14 calendar days before the commencement of each regular session.

Sessions of the Legislature are biennial, occurring during odd number years. The Nevada Legislature is one of only four states that have biennial sessions, the others being Montana, North Dakota, and Texas.

In order to be elected as a member in either chamber of the Legislature, a person must be a U.S. citizen, at least 21 years of age, a Nevada resident for one year, and a qualified voter in their residing district.

Standing Committees
.
Nevada Assembly Standing Committees
Commerce and Labor
Energy
Committee of the Whole
Corrections, Parole, and Probation
Education
Government Action
Health and Human Services
Judiciary
Legislative Operations and Elections
Natural Resources, Agriculture, and Mining
Taxation
Transportation
Ways and Means
Audit
General Government
Human Services
K-12/Higher Education/CIP
Public Safety, Natural Resources, and Transportation

Nevada Senate Standing Committees
Commerce, Labor, and Energy
Energy
Committee of the Whole
Finance
Audit
General Government
Human Services
K-12/Higher Education/CIP
Public Safety, Natural Resources, and Transportation
Government Affairs
Health and Human Services
Judiciary
Legislative Operations and Elections
Natural Resources
Revenue and Economic Development
Senate Parliamentary Rules and Procedures
Transportation

Meeting places

For seven years after Nevada's admission as a U.S. state in 1864, the Nevada Legislature did not have a proper meeting place. In 1869, the Legislature passed the State Capitol Act, signed into law by Governor Henry G. Blasdel, providing $100,000 for the construction of a capitol building. Under the supervision of designer Joseph Gosling, construction began on the Italianate building in 1870. The Legislature convened in the unfinished state capitol building the following year, with construction completed by the middle of the year. The Legislature continued to meet in the state capitol until 1971, when both chambers moved to the Legislative Building constructed just south of the original capitol. The old state capitol continues to be the office of the governor and other executive branch officials. The former Assembly and Senate chambers are now museums, and available for meetings.

History 
Sadie Hurst (1857–1952) was the first woman elected to the Nevada Legislature (R-Washoe), in 1918. When the legislature met in special session on February 7, 1920, to ratify the Federal Suffrage Amendment, it was Hurst, the  assemblywoman from Reno, who presented the resolution. She has the further distinction of being the first woman to preside over a state Legislature during the ratification of the Federal Suffrage Amendment.

The 80th Nevada Legislature, is the first women-majority bicameral state legislature in U.S. history. Two states have previously held a female majority in one legislative body.

See also

Nevada State Capitol
Nevada Assembly
Nevada Senate
Diversity in the Nevada Legislature
List of state and territorial capitols in the United States

References

External links
Nevada Legislature
Facts about the State of Nevada
Leaders and Members of the Assembly
Leaders and Members of the Senate
Nevada Legislature Records. Yale Collection of Western Americana, Beinecke Rare Book and Manuscript Library.

 
Bicameral legislatures